Changlingpi station is a Metro station of Shenzhen Metro Line 5. It opened on 22 June 2011. This station is an elevated station.

Station layout

Exits

Trivia
 The drivers usually relieve in this station, so that the metro will stay in this station for a bit longer time.

References

External links
 Shenzhen Metro Changlingpi Station (Chinese)
 Shenzhen Metro Changlingpi Station (English)

Shenzhen Metro stations
Railway stations in Guangdong
Nanshan District, Shenzhen
Railway stations in China opened in 2011